"My Way" is a song by Swedish singer Tone Sekelius, released as a single on 12 February 2022. It was performed in Melodifestivalen 2022 and made it to the final on 12 March 2022.

Charts

References

2022 songs
2022 singles
Melodifestivalen songs of 2022
Songs written by Wrethov